Misunderstood may refer to:

In music:
 The Misunderstood, a 1960s psychedelic rock band originating from Riverside, California
 "Misunderstood" (Bon Jovi song)
 "Misunderstood" (Mötley Crüe song)
 "Misunderstood" (Robbie Williams song)
 "Misunderstood" (Youngn Lipz song) (2019)
 "Misunderstood", a song by Dream Theater from the album Six Degrees of Inner Turbulence 
 "Misunderstood", a song from Pete Townshend and Ronnie Lane's album Rough Mix
 "Misunderstood", a song by Wilco from the album Being There
 "Misunderstood", a song by Kendrick Lamar from the mixtape C4
 Misunderstood, an album by Yung Bans
 Missunderstood (Queen Naija album), 2020
 (Miss)understood, an album by Ayumi Hamasaki
 Missundaztood, an album by Pink
 "Misunderstood" a song by Savuto Vakadewavosa And DJ Ritendra
 Misunderstood (group)

In other media:
 Misunderstood (1966 film), an Italian film
 Misunderstood (1984 film), an American film starring Henry Thomas
 Misunderstood (2014 film), an Italian film
 "Misunderstood" (short story), a story by P. G. Wodehouse included in The Uncollected Wodehouse

See also 
 Misunderstand (disambiguation)
 Misunderstanding (disambiguation)